Black magic refers to evil supernatural magic.

Black magic may also refer to:

Film and television
 Black Magic (1929 film), directed by George B. Seitz
 Black Magic (1944 film), a Charlie Chan film
 Black Magic (1949 film) (aka Cagliostro), directed by Gregory Ratoff and starring Orson Welles
 Black Magic (1975 film), a Hong Kong film
 Black Magic (1992 film), starring Rachel Ward and Judge Reinhold
 Black Magic (2019 film), starring Kelly Brook

Comics and games
 Black Magic (comics), a horror anthology begun in 1950
 Black Magic (video game), a 1987 computer game by Datasoft
 Black Magic (manga), a 1983 manga series written by Masamune Shirow, with an OVA made in 1987

Books
 Black Magic (book), a 1928 travel book by Paul Morand
 The Black Magician trilogy of books by Trudi Canavan

Products
 Black Magic (chocolates), a packaged chocolate assortment manufactured by Nestlé
 Blackmagic Design, a manufacturer of professional video equipment
 Black magic (programming), computer science jargon for arcane programming techniques

Transport
 Black Magic (yacht), NZL 32, the winning yacht in the 1995 America's Cup regatta, sailing for New Zealand
 Black Magic, a de Havilland DH.88 Comet aircraft

Music

Albums
 Black Magic (Magic Sam album), 1968
 Black Magic (Martha Reeves and the Vandellas album), 1972
 Black Magic (Jimmy Cliff album), 2004
 Black Magic (Swollen Members album), or the title track, 2006
 Black Magic (Yemi Alade album), 2017

Songs
 "Black Magic" (Little Mix song), 2015
 "Black Magic" (Baker Boy song), 2018
 "Black Magic" (Eminem song), 2020
 "Black Magic" (Jonasu song), 2020
 "Black Magic", by Slayer from Show No Mercy
 "Black Magic", by Dan the Banjo Man, 1974
 "Black Magic", by Magic Wands, 2008
 "Black Magic", short name of "That Old Black Magic", a 1942 popular song

Artists
 Blackmagic (musician), a Nigerian rapper, singer, and songwriter

See also
 Dark magic (disambiguation)
 Black art (disambiguation)